Bel RTL is a commercial radio network broadcasting in Brussels and Wallonia (French-speaking Belgium). The station is owned by the Radio H holding company, which is part of the Luxembourg-based RTL Group. It is now owned by DPG Media and Groupe Rossel since 31 March 2022.

Bel RTL is currently (as of 2021) the most widely listened-to commercial radio station in the French Community of Belgium. It is the station's aim to be as big in Belgium as its sister station RTL is in France. Many of Bel RTL's presenters came to the station from the RTL-TVI television channel.

Coverage 
Bel RTL broadcasts throughout Wallonia and Brussels on the following FM frequencies:

Programmes

References

External links

French-language radio stations in Belgium
Radio stations established in 1978
Radio stations established in 1991
1978 establishments in Belgium
1980s disestablishments in Belgium
1991 establishments in Belgium
Mass media in Brussels
Schaerbeek